Madurai Kamaraj University (MKU) is a public state university located in Madurai city, in southern Tamil Nadu, India, that was established in 1966. MKU is one of the 15 universities in India with the University with Potential for Excellence status, which was awarded by the University Grants Commission (UGC) in India. In 2021, the university was awarded an 'A++' grade from the National Assessment and Accreditation Council (NAAC) in its 4th cycle.

History 
The university was established in 1966 as Madurai University. In 1978, the name was changed to Madurai Kamaraj University to honor K. Kamaraj, former Chief Minister of Madras State.

Vice chancellors

Academics 

There are 121 colleges and institutions under MKU which include 16 aided colleges, 24 autonomous colleges (including both government and self-financed), 4 constituent colleges, 1 MKU college, 5 MKU evening colleges, 57 self-financed colleges and 14 approved institutions. Currently, the university consists of 77 renowned Departments and 20 renowned Schools as a whole.

Rankings 

The National Institutional Ranking Framework (NIRF) ranked Madurai Kamaraj University 83rd overall in India and 63rd among universities in 2021.

Notable alumni and faculties 
 T. P. Meenakshisundaram, 1st Honorable Vice-Chancellor of MKU and Padma Bhushan awardee
 Mu. Varadarajan, 2nd Honorable Vice-Chancellor of MKU and recipient of Sahitya Akademi Award for Tamil literature
 V. C. Kulandaiswamy, 4th Honorable Vice-Chancellor of MKU and Padma Bhushan awardee
 S. Krishnaswamy, 7th Honorable Vice-Chancellor of MKU and legendary biologist
 Arumugam Manthiram, fellow of Royal Society of Chemistry, delivered the 2019 Nobel Lecture in Chemistry on behalf of Chemistry Nobel Laureate John B. Goodenough. 
 A. S. Gnanasambandan, Tamil writer, scholar and literary critic
 G. Balasubramanian, former Vice Chancellor of Tamil University, Thanjavur, in Tamil Nadu, India (4 October 2018 – 3 October 2021)
 G. S. Venkataraman, Padma Shri awardee
 Veerappan Muthukkaruppan, renowned immunologist
 Charle, Indian actor
 AR Chelliah, Indian religious leader
 Dharmakkan Dhanaraj, Indian Old Testament Scholar
 R. M. Pitchappan, eminent immunogeneticist
 Kunthala Jayaraman, eminent biotechnologist
 Kuppamuthu Dharmalingam, the Shanti Swarup Bhatnagar laureate (for Biological Sciences)
 P. Sathasivam, 40th Chief Justice of India
 Rajan Sankaranarayanan, the Shanti Swarup Bhatnagar laureate (for Biological Sciences) and Infosys Prize winner
 Rajiah Simon, the Shanti Swarup Bhatnagar laureate (for Physical Sciences)
 Rishikesh Narayanan, the Shanti Swarup Bhatnagar laureate (for Biological Sciences)
 Ramamirtha Jayaraman, the Shanti Swarup Bhatnagar laureate (for Biological Sciences)
 Tho. Paramasivan, Tamil anthropologist, writer, folklorist, archeologist and professor
 Mohan Raghavan, Malayalam film director
 Mushi Santappa, the Shanti Swarup Bhatnagar laureate (for Chemical Sciences)
 Nirmal Selvamony, Indian scholar and academician
 S. Kameswaran, renowned ENT surgeon and Padma Shri awardee 
 H. Raja, eminent politician
 Gunasekaran Paramasamy, eminent scientist
 Karuppannan Veluthambi, eminent Plant Biotechnologist and Molecular Biologist
 Ram Rajasekharan, N-BIOS awardee
 Mukul Roy, eminent politician
 R. Sankararamakrishnan, N-BIOS awardee
 Syed Zahoor Qasim, Padma Bhushan awardee
 Kaustuv Sanyal, N-BIOS awardee
 K. S. Krishnan, Padma Bhushan awardee, Fellow of the Royal Society and the Shanti Swarup Bhatnagar laureate (for Physical Sciences)
 M. K. Chandrashekaran, the Shanti Swarup Bhatnagar laureate (for Biological Sciences)
 Sonajharia Minz, eminent Adivasi activist and current Vice Chancellor of Sido Kanhu Murmu University
 Thamizhachi Thangapandian, Indian Tamil poet, lyricist, orator, politician and writer
 Thavamani Jegajothivel Pandian, the Shanti Swarup Bhatnagar laureate (for Biological Sciences)
 Vijayalakshmi Navaneethakrishnan, Padma Shri awardee
 Ganapathy Baskaran, the Shanti Swarup Bhatnagar laureate (for Physical Sciences)
 Gopi Shankar Madurai, Indian equal rights and Indigenous rights activist
 Govindappa Venkataswamy, Padma Shri awardee and founder of Aravind Eye Care System
 Vijay Siva, Carnatic music vocalist
 Vivek, Indian actor and Padma Shri awardee
 Kailasavadivoo Sivan, eminent Indian space scientist and current Secretary (Space) and ex-officio chairman of Indian Space Research Organisation (ISRO) and Space Commission
 Kumaravel Somasundaram, N-BIOS awardee
 Nazarene Soosai, Roman Catholic Bishop
 A. R. Venkatachalapathy, Indian historian
 Shiv Nadar, Padma Bhushan awardee and Indian billionaire industrialist and philanthropist
 S. Viyalendiran, Sri Lankan-Tamil politician
 M. Thiurumalai, Tamil scholar, writer and professor
 Sendurai Mani, Indian-American oncologist 
 Ayyalusamy Ramamoorthy, Robert W. Parry Collegiate Professor of Chemistry and Biophysics at the University of Michigan, Ann Arbor and fellow of the Royal Society of Chemistry.
 K.K. Pillay, eminent Indian historian, headed the Department of History in University of Madras and the first President of South Indian History Congress in the premises of the School of Historical Studies, Madurai Kamaraj University
 Sankaran Krishnaswamy, eminent computational biologist
 Ganapathy Marimuthu, renowned chronobiologist
 Shabaana Khader, notable Indian-American microbiologist

Other associated people
 S. Ramachandran, Padma Bhushan awardee
 Ch. Mohan Rao, the Shanti Swarup Bhatnagar laureate (for Medical Sciences),  Executive Committee member for the Centre of Excellence of the Bioinformatics Centre (founded by Prof. Kappamuthu Dharmalingam), Madurai Kamaraj University, 2004
 P.N. Rangarajan, the Shanti Swarup Bhatnagar laureate (for Medical Sciences) and N-BIOS awardee, Coconvenor of the lecture workshop on Recent Advances in Biotechnology of Health and Disease (BHD-2011) organized by Madurai Kamaraj University in 2011 
 Sathees Chukkurumbal Raghavan, the Shanti Swarup Bhatnagar laureate (for Biological Sciences), Convenor of the lecture workshop on Recent Advances in Biotechnology of Health and Disease (BHD-2011) organized by Madurai Kamaraj University in 2011 
 Erwin Bünning, eminent German chronobiologist, invited by M. K. Chandrashekaran to India in 1978, to conduct the Biological Oscillation workshop in Madurai Kamaraj University
 Dorairajan Balasubramanian, the Shanti Swarup Bhatnagar laureate (for Chemical Sciences), Padma Shri awardee and member of the advisory committee for 'International Conference on Genome Biology 2019 (ICGB-2019)' organized by the School of Biological Sciences, Madurai Kamaraj University
 Dipankar Chatterji, the Shanti Swarup Bhatnagar laureate (for Biological Sciences), Padma Shri awardee and member of the advisory committee for 'International Conference on Genome Biology 2019 (ICGB-2019)' organized by the School of Biological Sciences, Madurai Kamaraj University
 Seyed Ehtesham Hasnain, the Shanti Swarup Bhatnagar laureate (for Biological Sciences), Padma Shri awardee and member of the advisory committee for 'International Conference on Genome Biology 2019 (ICGB-2019)' organized by the School of Biological Sciences, Madurai Kamaraj University
 Rakesh Bhatnagar, member of the advisory committee for 'International Conference on Genome Biology 2019 (ICGB-2019)' organized by the School of Biological Sciences, Madurai Kamaraj University
 Tapas Kumar Kundu, the Shanti Swarup Bhatnagar laureate (for Biological Sciences), N-BIOS awardee and member of the advisory committee for 'International Conference on Genome Biology 2019 (ICGB-2019)' organized by the School of Biological Sciences, Madurai Kamaraj University
 Siddhartha Roy, the Shanti Swarup Bhatnagar laureate (for Biological Sciences) and member of the advisory committee for 'International Conference on Genome Biology 2019 (ICGB-2019)' organized by the School of Biological Sciences, Madurai Kamaraj University
 Rakesh Mishra, member of the advisory committee for 'International Conference on Genome Biology 2019 (ICGB-2019)' organized by the School of Biological Sciences, Madurai Kamaraj University
 P. Namperumalsamy, Padma Shri awardee and the Co-investigator on a  research  Project  “Clinical and Laboratory Studies on  Eales  Disease”  in  collaboration  with National Eye Institute,  Washington,  United States and Indian Council of Medical Research and Madurai Kamaraj University.

International collaborations 
University of Oxford: Discovery of first Indians in 2008
University of Munich: Genomics research and studies
University of Tubingen: Collaborative research and faculty-student exchange
Harvard University: Ancient DNA research
University of Melbourne: Student exchange and research
University of Oslo and Institute for Energy Technology: Indo-Norwegian International Online Conference on “Functional materials for energy, environment And biomedical applications" (FARAON 2022)
Algoma Algal Biotechnology, University of Wisconsin: From 2017
Eastern University, Sri Lanka: From 2017
Uppsala University: From 2018
South Dakota School of Mines: Staff exchange and collaboration, joint research activities and publications, student exchange
Museum and Institute of Zoology of the Polish Academy of Sciences: Research collaboration 
National Cancer Institute, National Institutes of Health: Research collaboration 
Okayama University: Research collaboration 
University of Veterinary Medicine,Hannover: Research collaboration 
Loyola University: Research collaboration 
Max Planck Institute for Heart and Lung Research: Research collaboration 
Graduate Medical School, Singapore: Cancer Genomics Project

See also 
American College, Madurai
Sri S. Ramaswamy Naidu Memorial College
University of Madras
Indian Institute of Science
Alagappa University

References

External links

 Madurai Kamaraj University

 
Colleges in Madurai
Educational institutions established in 1966
Universities in Tamil Nadu
Universities and colleges in Madurai
1966 establishments in Madras State
Monuments and memorials to Kamaraj